Vitalite is a sunflower oil based spread, produced by Dairy Crest in Kirkby, Merseyside.

It began in 1983, being made by Kraft General Foods. In July 1996, it was bought by St Ivel, who were then bought by Dairy Crest in November 2002. In 2008, it was relaunched as a dairy-free spread, making it suitable for vegans.

Advertising
A famous advertising campaign began in the United Kingdom during the 1980s, featured dancing sunflowers and a singing sun, with a parody of the song Israelites by Desmond Dekker. This campaign ran until 1994. The parody began:

"Wake up in the morning wantin' some breakfast. What sunflower spread do I lay on my bread? Ohhh, Ohhh, Vitalite."

References

External links
 Vitalite dairy free spread – official site
 Vitalite advert on YouTube

Margarine brands
British brands
Vegan cuisine